George Thomas Bloomfield (5 February 1882 – 1 November 1958) was an Australian cricketer. He played three first-class matches for South Australia between 1908 and 1909.

References

External links
 

1882 births
1958 deaths
Australian cricketers
South Australia cricketers
Cricketers from Adelaide